Žirnenka (formerly ) is a village in Kėdainiai district municipality, in Kaunas County, in central Lithuania. According to the 2011 census, the village was uninhabited. It is located 1.5 km from Sirutiškis, on the left bank of the Kruostas river.

Demography

References

Villages in Kaunas County
Kėdainiai District Municipality